Thinker on a Rock is a bronze sculpture by Barry Flanagan.

Brian Ferriso, executive director of the Philbrook Museum of Art, said:"The playful subject matter clearly references several art historical traditions, including that of Rodin. In addition to the subject, this work's expressive nature encapsulates the artist's unique ability to create three-dimensional 'gestural' drawings with bronze."There are eight casts of the work, with six of them installed at:

 Washington University in St. Louis
 John and Mary Pappajohn Sculpture Park, Des Moines, Iowa
 Utrecht, Netherlands 
 O’Connell Street in Dublin 
 Philbrook Museum of Art, in Tulsa, Oklahoma
 The National Gallery of Art Sculpture Garden, in Washington, D.C.

Gallery

See also
 List of public art in Washington, D.C., Ward 2

References

Sculptures in the United States
1997 sculptures
Collections of the National Gallery of Art
Sculptures in Washington, D.C.
Bronze sculptures in the United States
National Gallery of Art Sculpture Garden